Bradley de Nooijer (born 7 November 1997) is a Dutch professional footballer who plays mainly as a left-back for Bulgarian club CSKA Sofia.

Club career
De Nooijer made his professional debut for FC Dordrecht on 5 August 2016, in a 1–1 Eerste Divisie draw with FC Oss.

Personal life
De Nooijer's father and uncle, Gérard and Dennis, respectively, were professional footballers. His cousin, Jeremy, also plays the sport.

Career statistics

Club

Honours
Viitorul Constanța
Cupa României: 2018–19
Supercupa României: 2019

Individual
Best goal in Bulgarian football for 2022

References

External links

1997 births
Living people
Dutch footballers
Dutch people of Curaçao descent
Sportspeople from Vlissingen
Footballers from Zeeland
Association football defenders
Eerste Divisie players
FC Dordrecht players
Liga I players
FC Viitorul Constanța players
FCV Farul Constanța players
Ukrainian Premier League players
FC Vorskla Poltava players
PFC CSKA Sofia players
Netherlands youth international footballers
Dutch expatriate footballers
Expatriate footballers in Romania
Dutch expatriate sportspeople in Romania
Expatriate footballers in Ukraine
Dutch expatriate sportspeople in Ukraine
First Professional Football League (Bulgaria) players